John Christian Kunkel (September 18, 1816 – October 14, 1870) was a Whig and Republican member of the U.S. House of Representatives from Pennsylvania.  He was the grandfather of John Crain Kunkel.

Biography
He was born in Harrisburg, Pennsylvania.  He attended the common schools of Gettysburg, Pennsylvania, and graduated from Jefferson College in Canonsburg, Pennsylvania (later Washington & Jefferson College in Washington, Pennsylvania).  In 1839, he studied law at the Carlisle Law School.  He was admitted to the Dauphin County bar in 1842 and commenced practice in Harrisburg.  He gained a reputation as a public speaker, and during the presidential campaigns of 1844 he spoke much in favor of Henry Clay. He served in the Pennsylvania State House of Representatives in 1844, 1845, and again in 1850, and was a member of the Pennsylvania State Senate from 1851 to 1853.  He served as speaker in 1852 and 1853.

Kunkel was elected as an Oppositionist to the Thirty-fourth Congress and reelected as a Republican to the Thirty-fifth Congress.  He was chairman of the House Committee on Militia during the Thirty-fourth Congress.  He was not a candidate for renomination in 1858. He is interred at Harrisburg Cemetery.

References

The Political Graveyard

External links

1816 births
1870 deaths
Burials at Harrisburg Cemetery
Politicians from Harrisburg, Pennsylvania
Pennsylvania Whigs
Opposition Party members of the United States House of Representatives from Pennsylvania
Republican Party members of the United States House of Representatives from Pennsylvania
Members of the Pennsylvania House of Representatives
Pennsylvania state senators
Washington & Jefferson College alumni
19th-century American politicians